Hans Olsson (born December 18, 1964) is a Swedish sprint canoer who competed from the late 1980s to the mid-1990s. He won two medals at the ICF Canoe Sprint World Championships with two bronzes (K-4 10000 m: 1990, 1991).

Olsson also competed in two Summer Olympics, earning his best finish of seventh twice (K-2 1000 m: 1988, K-4 1000 m: 1992).

References

Sports-reference.com profile

1964 births
Canoeists at the 1988 Summer Olympics
Canoeists at the 1992 Summer Olympics
Living people
Olympic canoeists of Sweden
Swedish male canoeists
ICF Canoe Sprint World Championships medalists in kayak